"Here We Go" is a fight song of the Pittsburgh Steelers that was written by Roger Wood in 1994. It has sold more than 120,000 copies since its introduction. It remains popular among Pittsburghers despite being updated due to the departure of several of the players mentioned in the original lyrics and that the Steelers no longer need to win "that one for the thumb" after having won Super Bowl XL.  The song was updated following a 2006 online vote conducted by the Pittsburgh Post-Gazette.

References

National Football League fight songs
Pittsburgh Steelers
1994 songs